Liulinzhou is a subdistrict and the seat of Junshan District in Yueyang Prefecture-level City, Hunan, China. The subdistrict was reorganized through the amalgamation of Xicheng Subdistrict and the former Liuinzhou Town on November 20.

See also 
 List of township-level divisions of Hunan

References

Junshan District
Subdistricts of Hunan
County seats in Hunan